Leutschach an der Weinstraße is since January 2015 a new municipality with 3,794 residents (as of 1 January 2016) in the Leibnitz District of Styria, Austria.

The municipality was founded as part of the Styria municipal structural reform,
on 31 December 2014, from the dissolved independent municipalities Leutschach, Schloßberg, Eichberg-Trautenburg and Glanz an der Weinstraße.

On January 1, 2015, the administration of the new market town, Leutschach an der Weinstraße, moved into the renovated office building, in which all municipal council offices are housed.

The town formed, together with Ehrenhausen an der Weinstraße, Arnfels, Oberhaag and Straß in Steiermark, the tourism agency "Die südsteirische Weinstraße" with base in the town Leutschach an der Weinstraße.

Geography

Municipality arrangement 
The municipal territory includes the following ten sections or like-named Katastralgemeinden (populations as of 1 January 2015,):
 Eichberg-Trautenburg (568)
 Fötschach (637)
 Glanz (183; 578.39 ha)
 Großwalz (129; 739.12 ha)
 Kranach (203; 699.66 ha)
 Langegg (88; 89.34 ha)
 Leutschach (557; 111.02 ha)
 Pößnitz (485)
 Remschnigg (256)
 Schloßberg (672)

History 
In 1250, the name "Leutschach" was first recorded ("Liubschach"). In 1458 Emperor Frederick III gave the place the market right and the own jurisdiction.

The municipality Leutschach originated in 1850 from the Werbbezirk Trautenburg and was then substantially greater. It was divided in 1882 into the municipalities of Markt Leutschach, Glanz, Schloßberg and Eichberg-Trautenburg. Due to the restructuring of the state of Styria, the autonomy of the four municipalities ended after 132 years.

Mayors of Leutschach from 1860 to 1882 
1850–1852 Josef Ludwig Bayer, Gutsbesitzer zu Amthofen
1852–1859 Ignaz Strohmeier
1859–1861 Philip Dreu
1861–1867 Alois Heu, Kaufmann
1867–1870 Ferdinand Hirzer, Bäcker
1870–1873 Johann Grabner
1873–1876 Alois Kniely, Gastwirt und Bäcker
1876–1882 Ferdinand Hirzer, Johann Brand und Johann Zaunschirm
1882–1883 Josef Hartnagel, Lederer

Politics

Mayor 
Erich Plasch was elected mayor of the newly formed municipality in June 2015. Plasch had been until 31 December 2014, mayor of the market town Leutschach. In the transition period, Reinhold Elsnig was government commissioner of the merger.

Municipal council 
The new municipal council was formed with 21 members. After the election of 2015, the following members were set:
 17 Mandate ÖVP,
 2 Mandate SPÖ and
 2 Mandate FPÖ.

The prior elections had the following results:

Economy and Infrastructure

Economics 
Leutschach an der Weinstraße is the largest wine-growing community in Styria and thus an important center of Styrian wine-growing. To this end, tourism, which has grown steadily in recent decades, is the main source of income for the many companies.
Leutschach is also the second largest hops cultivation area in Austria. The high-quality hops are processed in the Styrian breweries to be appreciated special beers.

Infrastructure 
As a residential community, Leutschach an der Weinstraße offers all the important social and economic care facilities. Three general practitioners, a specialist in dentistry, a pharmacy and a branch of the Red Cross provide medical care.

Education 
The educational institutions of the greater community include: two kindergartens (Leutschach and Langegg), the childcare facility "Lachtraube", two elementary schools (Leutschach and Langegg), and the NMS Leutschach.

Transportation 
In 1910, a railway was planned to lead from Marburg over the Pössnitzberg that Pößnitz-, Saggau- and Sulmtal by Leibniz. The project failed then by the beginning of the First World War.

In terms of traffic, the individual cadastral communities and localities are today largely developed by the individual traffic ( of common roads). Public buses connect Leutschach with neighboring municipalities and the district capital of Leibnitz. The nearest train stations are in Ehrenhausen and Leibnitz.

Culture and sights 
 Heiligengeistklamm
 Kirche zum Heiligen Geist am Osterberg, unweit der österr. Grenze in Slowenien
 Schloss Trautenburg
 Burgruine Schmirnberg
 Schloßbergwarte am Montikogel

Culture and societies 
Many associations (Musikverein Rebenland Leutschach, Church Choir, Customs associations, Volksstanzkreis) contribute to a good cultural environment. The numerous events include: Thanksgiving parade, carnival procession, church concerts, Advent concerts, Christmas, Corpus Christi procession, Easter procession, church festival or the pilgrimage to the Holy Spirit made on Pentecost Sunday.

Notable residents 
 Nicos Jaritz (born 1953), percussionist and bandleader
 Konrad Jarz (1842–1909), adventurer, historian and geographer
 Franz Unger (1800–1870), an Austrian botanist, paleontologist and plant physiologist

Literature 
 Die Rebenland-Chronik: Die gemeinsame Geschichte der vier Gemeinden Eichberg-Trautenburg, Glanz an der Weinstraße, Leutschach und Schlossberg (2004),

References

External links 

 Gemeindedaten, Landesstatistik.Steiermark.at
 

Cities and towns in Leibnitz District
2015 establishments in Austria